The Many may refer to:

The Many, a fictional alien communion in the video game System Shock 2
The Many (novel), a book by Wyl Menmuir
The Many (advertising agency), an American agency formerly known as Mistress